This timeline of the third phase of the 2022 Russian invasion of Ukraine covers the period from 12 September 2022, when Ukrainian forces retook substantial ground during counteroffensives in the south and east, to 9 November 2022 when Ukrainian troops retook Kherson. Starting in October, Russia began a campaign of massive strikes against Ukrainian infrastructure.

This timeline is a dynamic and fluid list, and as such may never satisfy criteria of completeness. Please note that some events may only be fully understood and/or discovered in retrospect.

September 2022

12 September
Ukraine claimed it had reached the Russia–Ukraine border.

Thirty-five Russian municipal deputies signed a petition calling for Putin to resign.

13 September
On the Kherson front, it was reported that Russian forces had withdrawn from Kiselyovka, a settlement 15 km from Kherson. The Ukrainian armed forces announced that the frontline in the Kherson region had advanced by 12 km and that  including 13 settlements had been recovered.

Ukrainian Governor of Luhansk Oblast, Serhiy Haidai, stated that Russian forces had left Kreminna three days ago, the Ukrainian flag has been raised by local residents and that Ukrainian forces had not yet entered the town. He also said that Russian forces had fled Starobilsk, adding that the city was "practically empty".

14 September

After a phone call with Vladimir Putin, German Chancellor Olaf Scholz told journalists that Putin did not seem to believe that the invasion of Ukraine was a mistake. UN Secretary-General António Guterres also said that prospects for a peace negotiation were "minimal".

Russian forces launched eight cruise missiles at the dam of the Karachunivske reservoir causing extensive flooding in Kryvyi Rih and a  increase of water level in the Inhulets River.

15 September
The United States announced a $600 million aid package for Ukraine, including additional HIMARS ammunition, "tens of thousands" of 105 mm artillery rounds, one thousand 155 mm rounds, counter-drone systems, winter gear, and night vision devices.

16 September
BM-21 missiles and heavy artillery shelled Nikopol, injuring 1 and damaging 11 high-rise buildings, a kindergarten, a school, gas furnaces, and power lines.

17 September
Two people were killed as the result of a rocket attack by Russian forces on residential buildings in the town of Chuhuiv.

18 September
Catherine, Princess of Wales met Olena Zelenska, the first lady of Ukraine, at Buckingham Palace on Sunday.

19 September

The Ukrainian Ground Forces recaptured the village of Bilohorivka in Luhansk Oblast during their advance on Lysychansk.

A Russian missile hit the outskirts of the South Ukraine Nuclear Power Plant, damaging buildings and a neighboring hydroelectric power station. Nuclear reactors were not damaged.

20 September
The Russian State Duma introduced laws prohibiting voluntary surrender and looting, with aggravating circumstances including committing the crime "during mobilization or martial law". Under those circumstances, refusing to obey a superior's order or participate in military action was also made illegal. Penalties for not reporting for military duty, or leaving it without permission, were increased.

The Russian-appointed officials of the self-proclaimed Donetsk and Luhansk People's Republics announced referendums to approve their annexation by Russia on 23–27 September. Similar referendums were announced by the occupying Russian officials in Kherson and Zaporizhzhia.

The Council of the EU approved 5 billion euros of macro-financial assistance for Ukraine.

21 September

In a prerecorded speech, Vladimir Putin officially announced partial mobilization to begin immediately. Although Putin's address stated only reservists will be called up, with a focus on reservists with military experience, the official decree allowed for any citizen to be conscripted with exceptions for only age, sickness, and imprisonment status; it was reported that anti-war protesters who had been arrested were being conscripted. Furthermore, militants in the Luhansk and Donetsk People's Republics will be considered soldiers of the Russian Federation going forward, and the LPR and DPR military units will be reordered according to Russian standards. Defence minister Sergei Shoigu said that 300,000 reservists will be mobilized. Putin also raised the threat of a nuclear response, saying "Russia will use all the instruments at its disposal to counter a threat against its territorial integrity—this is not a bluff".

The Ministry of Foreign Affairs of Saudi Arabia reported that Russia released ten foreign prisoners of war after mediation by Mohammed bin Salman. According to Robert Jenrick, the junior health minister of Britain, Aiden Aslin is among the prisoners released. Viktor Medvedchuk was reportedly freed as part of the deal.

A record high of 215 Ukrainian soldiers, including fighters who led the defence of the Azovstal steelworks in Mariupol, have been released in a prisoner exchange with Russia after mediation by Turkish President Recep Tayyip Erdoğan. Zelenskyy announced that, as part of the agreement, five of the freed captives would remain in Turkey in secure but comfortable conditions until the war is over.

23 September
Russian-occupied regions held referendums to join Russia. US President Joe Biden and German Chancellor Olaf Scholz referred to them as shams.

In Izium, in the Kharkiv region, the exhumation a mass burial was completed. A total of 436 bodies were recovered, of which thirty had traces of torture.

The Armed Forces of Ukraine reestablished control over the settlement of Yatskivka in the Donetsk region. The settlement is east of the Oskil river, which acts as a front line for a large portion of the eastern front.

26 September
The United Kingdom introduced new sanctions against Russia due to Russia's holding of pseudo-referendums in occupied Ukrainian territories. The sanctions list includes 92 individuals and legal entities, including 33 Russian officials sent to the occupied territories of Ukraine as well as 55 top managers of Russian state-owned companies.

27 September
More than 1600 Russian propaganda accounts were taken down by Facebook.

The Armed Forces of Ukraine retook the village of Kupiansk-Vuzlovyi in the Kharkiv region. As of 27 September, up to 6% of the territory of the Kharkiv region remained under occupation.

The results of the referendums in the Russian-occupied territories were announced, all of which were in favor of annexation into Russia, with Donetsk 99.23% in favour, Luhansk 98.42% in favour, Kherson 87.05%, and Zaporizhzhia at 93.11%. There were planned votes in the Mykolaiv and Kharkiv oblasts that never materialized, mainly owing to limited control of territory. As a side effect of these referendums, Russia may now claim that the "very existence of the state is at risk", since much of the war is happening on what it now illegally considers Russian territory. This may be used as justification of using nuclear weapons.

Over 194,000 Russian citizens, primarily fighting age men and their families, have left Russia in what has been called a "mass exodus" after the announcement of a draft of 300,000 citizens to fight in the war. Many have gone to Kazakhstan, Serbia, Georgia, and Finland.

28 September
NATO Secretary-General Jens Stoltenberg attributed the Nord Stream pipeline leaks to acts of sabotage. The next day, the Swedish Coast Guard found a fourth leak on Nord Stream 2.

The Ukrainian police have recorded at least 582 war crimes committed by Russia in the formerly occupied territories of the Kharkiv Oblast.

The United States announced a $1.1 billion aid package to Ukraine, including:
 18 High Mobility Artillery Rocket Systems (HIMARS) and ammunition
 150 Armored High Mobility Multipurpose Wheeled Vehicles (Humvee)
 150 tactical vehicles to tow weapons
 40 trucks and 80 trailers
 2 radars for unmanned aerial systems
 20 multi-mission radars

29 September
Finland announced the closure of its borders to Russian citizens at midnight. The Finnish Government deemed that the Russian mobilization and the rapidly increasing volume of tourists arriving in and transiting via the country endanger Finland's international position and relations.

Ukraine fully captured Kupiansk. Russian soldiers held positions on the eastern beach of the river Oskil that flows through the city. Exchange of fire happened until the positions had been taken.

Vladimir Putin signed decrees recognizing the sovereignty and independence of Kherson Oblast and Zaporizhzhia Oblast.

30 September
At least thirty civilians died and dozens more were injured in Zaporizhzhia when a Russian missile hit a humanitarian convoy.

Putin held a speech in a so-called "signing ceremony" intended to mark the Russian annexation of Southeastern Ukraine. In the speech, Putin announced claims on Donetsk, Luhansk, Kherson and Zaporizhzhia, saying they were now "four new regions" of the Russian Federation. In response, Zelenskyy asked NATO to give Ukraine membership into the military alliance.

October 2022

1 October
Ukrainian troops raised the Ukrainian flag at an entrance to the city of Lyman. Russia confirmed that it had lost control of Lyman later that afternoon.

Zelenskyy announced that Ukrainian soldiers retook Yampil, a town near Lyman.

Kyiv announced the deaths of 24 citizens, 13 of whom were children, in a Russian strike in Kharkiv.

Chechen leader Ramzan Kadyrov called on Putin to take "more drastic measures", including martial law and the use of low-yield nuclear weapons. This is in response to the Russian withdrawal from Lyman where he placed blame on communication among leadership and supply issues.

2 October
A Ukrainian armoured offensive burst through Russian lines in the south capturing multiple villages along the Dnieper river. This was the biggest Ukrainian advance in the south since the war began.

3 October
It was reported that Russian forces had fled from Nyzhe Zolone, Pidlyman, Nyznya Zhuravka, Borova and Shyikivka in Kharkiv Oblast and that Ukrainian authorities had regained control of those settlements, effectively ending the Russian occupation of Kharkiv Oblast.

4 October
According to Russian Defence Minister Sergei Shoigu, more than 200,000 people have been called up for military service since Russia announced a "partial mobilization".

The US announced a new package of $625 million to Ukraine. They also sent 4 more HIMARS rocket artillery systems.

Ukrainian forces regained control of numerous settlements north of the Dnieper River in Kherson Oblast including Davydiv Brid, Lyubymivka, Khreshchenivka, Zolota Balka, Bilyaivka, Ukrainka and Velyka Oleksandrivka.

5 October
The pro-Russian deputy head of the Kherson region, Kirill Stremousov, stated that Russian forces were regrouping to strike back at Ukrainian troops; he added that the Ukrainian advance had been "halted" and therefore it was "not possible" for the Ukrainian Army to break through to the city of Kherson. The Russians were seemingly retreating to fortified positions around Nova Kakhovka. Russian officers (but not troops) were reported as withdrawing from Snihurivka.

6 October
According to CNN, unidentified "US intelligence officials" believe that the car bombing of Darya Dugina may have been authorized "by elements within the Ukrainian government".

Ukrainian authorities found two mass graves in liberated Lyman.

Russian forces launched seven rockets into apartment buildings in Zaporizhzhia, killing at least three people and wounding twelve others. The casualties rose to 17 (including one child) by 9 October.

7 October
Ukrainian officials said they shot down 20 drones in the last 24 hours.

8 October
An explosion on the Crimean Bridge caused a section to burn and partially collapse resulting in the death of at least 3 people.

9 October
Russian Armed Forces launched six missiles at an apartment block in Zaporizhzhia, resulting in the deaths of 13 people and injuring more than 89 others.

10 October

Russia launched a massive missile strike across the entire territory of Ukraine, including the capital, Kyiv, killing at least 23 civilians and injuring more than 100. Putin said that Russia carried out this attack as revenge for the attack on the Crimean Bridge. The German Embassy in Kyiv was damaged due to the strikes. No officials were present at the embassy since it has been vacant since the war began.

Alexander Lukashenko announced Belarus would form a "joint regional group of forces" with Russia, possibly also joining the war further on. Lukashenko said, "If they touch one metre of our territory then the Crimean Bridge will seem to them like a walk in the park."

12 October

The United Nations General Assembly passed Resolution ES-11/4 by a large majority, calling on countries not to recognise the four regions of Ukraine which Russia has claimed, following so-called referendums held late last month, and demanding that Moscow reverse course on its "attempted illegal annexation". 143 member states voted in favor and 35 abstained, notably China and India. Only Belarus, North Korea, Nicaragua, Russia and Syria voted against the resolution.

13 October
Russian forces launched eight missiles at Mykolaiv, hitting a five-story residential building. One of the victims was an 11-year-old boy.

A Ukrainian MiG-29 became the first manned aircraft to be downed by a drone during combat. The pilot claimed to have destroyed a Shahed-136 drone with his cannon, with the resulting blast downing the aircraft and hospitalising the pilot.

15 October
Eleven people were killed and 15 others injured after two shooters opened fire on a group of volunteers at a Russian military training ground in Soloti, Belgorod Oblast, near the border with Ukraine. The two attackers were killed during the incident.

17 October

Ukrainian officials claimed to have found wreckage of multiple HESA Shahed 136 kamikaze drones which struck Kyiv, causing three to four explosions and killing at least 4 people, according to the city's mayor, Vitali Klitschko. Another four were killed in Sumy. This came after Russian President Vladimir Putin said there was no need for further "large-scale" strikes on Ukraine. According to a Reuters journalist, some drones bore the inscription "For Belgorod". In Mykolaiv the mayor, Oleksandr Senkevich, said sunflower oil tanks caught fire after a drone attack. The Ukrainian Air Force said it intercepted 37 drones.

A Russian Sukhoi Su-34 fighter-bomber crashed into a residential building in the Russian city of Yeysk, causing multiple apartments to catch fire. The pilots managed to eject safely, according to Russian agencies; 13 people were killed and 19 injured in the crash.

18 October
According to Ukrainian officials, Russian forces have struck "critical infrastructure" north of Kyiv and in Zhytomyr, leading to water and power cuts in Zhytomyr. In Kyiv "several explosions" were heard, while in Mykolaiv a person is claimed to have been killed by a missile strike. Dnipro was also attacked. President Zelenskyy claims that over the last 8 days, since 10 October, a third of Ukrainian power stations have been destroyed. He wrote on Twitter: "no space left for negotiations with Russian President Vladimir Putin's regime." In total, over the last 10 days, Ukrainian national emergency services claim that 70 people were killed, 290 were wounded and 1,162 villages and towns remain without power due to attacks on electrical infrastructure.

In a prisoner swap between Ukraine and Russia, 108 women were freed, including 97 service personnel and 37 Azovstal evacuees.

Ukraine recognised the Chechen Republic of Ichkeria as "Territory temporarily occupied by Russia".

19 October
Sergey Surovikin said that civilians were being relocated from Kherson in preparation for a Ukrainian offensive on the city. It looks to be aimed at 50 to 60 thousand civilians. Ukraine has called on residents to ignore the Russian move.

Russian President Vladimir Putin declared martial law in the annexed Donetsk, Luhansk, Kherson, and Zaporizhzhia Oblasts. Russia also introduced an "intermediate response level" in Crimea and Sevastopol, and in regions bordering Ukraine: Krasnodar Krai and the Belgorod, Bryansk, Voronezh, Kursk, and Rostov Oblasts.

22 October
Power outages were reported across Ukraine as Russian airstrikes across the country struck critical infrastructure and energy facilities.

23 October
The US has dismissed Russian fears of Ukraine using a dirty bomb. Two weeks later, UN nuclear inspectors announced they had found no evidence of a dirty bomb in Ukraine.

24 October
Ukraine has accused Russia of delaying 165 cargo ships heading from Turkey to Ukraine.

26 October
Russia started recruiting members of the Afghan National Army Commando Corps, soldiers trained by the US Navy SEALs and British Armed Forces.

A Russian missile strike on Dnipro killed two people, including a pregnant woman.

Russian forces have deported about 70,000 Ukrainian civilians from the right bank of the Dnieper river, some of them to southern Russia.

27 October
Vladimir Putin is said to have monitored drills of Russia's strategic nuclear forces.

Moscow-backed authorities in Zaporizhzhia ordered phone checks on local residents following the implementation of military censorship.

Kyiv will have stricter blackouts due to the drone strikes.

28 October
South Korea has denied they were sending weapons to Ukraine after Putin's remarks that such a move "would destroy relations".

The European Union appointed General Piotr Trytek of Poland to lead its training mission for Ukrainian troops.

29 October
The Russian-occupied Sevastopol Naval Base was attacked by unmanned surface vehicles and drones. Nine UAVs and seven USVs were destroyed according to Russian officials. Russia accused Britain of being involved in the preparation of the attacks. The UK Ministry of Defence responded, saying Russia was "peddling lies on an epic scale". After the attack, Russia suspended its participation in the Black Sea Grain Initiative but resumed its participation four days later. One of the ships which appeared to be damaged in videos was the Admiral Makarov, the new flagship of Russia's Black Sea Fleet following the sinking of the Moskva.

31 October

Russian Armed Forces launched more than 50 missiles at energy infrastructure in Kyiv, and other regions such as Kharkiv, Zaporizhzhia, Cherkasy and Kirovohrad. 13 people were injured by the strikes. Up to 18 facilities were hit, according to Prime Minister Denys Shmyhal. 40% of Kyiv residents were left without water and 270,000 apartments were left without electricity. One missile shot down by Ukraine fell in the Moldovan village of Naslavcea, causing no casualties but shattering windows in some houses. Moldova told an unnamed Russian embassy employee to leave the country, making him a persona non grata.

November 2022

1 November
Russia announced the completion of its partial mobilization.

3 November
The US said that North Korea was covertly shipping artillery to Russia.

In a prisoner swap, 107 Ukrainian servicemen were returned to Ukraine.

The Zaporizhzhia nuclear power plant is running on backup generators due to Russian shelling.

4 November
Ukrainian Defence Minister Oleksii Reznikov has announced that Ukroboronprom will start manufacturing 152 and 122mm shells for its Soviet-era weapons.

5 November

President Putin has signed a decree that allows people convicted of serious crimes to be mobilised into the Russian army. Exempted from this decree are people convicted of sex crimes involving minors and crimes against the state such as treason, spying or terrorism—such people still cannot be mobilised. This could allow "hundreds of thousands" of people to be mobilised.

9 November
Ukrainian forces entered Snihurivka. Russian forces announced their withdrawal from the city of Kherson and their retreat to the east bank of the Dnipro.

The pro-Russian deputy head of the Kherson region, Kirill Stremousov, died in a car crash near Henichesk.

See also
Outline of the Russo-Ukrainian War
Bibliography of Ukrainian history

References

Timelines of the 2022 Russian invasion of Ukraine
2022 timelines
Political timelines of the 2020s by year
Russo-Ukrainian War
Timelines of military conflicts since 1945
Timelines of the Russo-Ukrainian War
War crimes during the 2022 Russian invasion of Ukraine